The 2012–13 Cruz Azul season is the 66th professional season of Mexico's top-flight football league. The season is split into four tournaments—the Torneo Apertura, Torneo Clausura, Cup Apertura and the Cup Clausura.

Club

Personnel

Coaching staff

Current kit
Provider:  Umbro.
Sponsors:  Cemento Cruz Azul,  Coca-Cola,  Telcel,  Tecate,  Volaris.

Current squad
As of June 2012: Listed on the official website of Cruz Azul.

From youth system

Transfers

Summer

In and loan

Out and loan

Winter

In and loan

Out and loan

Competitions

Cruz Azul play four different tournaments in the 2012–13 season are Apertura 2012, Clausura 2013, Apertura 2012 Copa Mexico and Clausura 2013 Copa Mexico.

Overall

Results by opponent (league)

Source:Cruz Azul Matches at soccerway.com 2012–13 Liga MX season article

Competitions statistics

2012 Torneo Apertura

Kickoff times are in CTZ or CST=UTC−06:00 and DST=UTC−05:00.

Pre-Season Summer 2012

Regular phase

General table

Copa MX

Kickoff times are in CTZ or CST=UTC−06:00 and DST=UTC−05:00.

Group stage
Round 1

Cruz Azul won the series 4 – 2.
Round 2

Cruz Azul won the series 1 – 0.
Round 3

Group table

Torneo Clausura 2013
Kickoff times are in CTZ or CST=UTC−06:00 and DST=UTC−05:00.

Pre-Season Winter 2012

Regular phase

Classification table

General table

Squad statistics

Start formations

Starting XI

|-----
!style="background: #C0C0C0;color:#FFFFFF" colspan="6"| 11 starters
|-----

 

|-----
!style="background: #C0C0C0;color:#FFFFFF" colspan="6"| Other starters
|-----

Apps, goals and discipline

League  = Apertura 2012 & Clausura 2013  

Cup  = Copa Mexico  

Playoffs  = Final Phase of the Apertura 2012 & Clausura 2013

|-
|align="left"|||align="left"|GK||align="left"|
|2||-1||0||0||0||0||2||-1||0||0||(-) means goals conceded
|-
|align="left"|12||align="left"|GK||align="left"|Guillermo Allison
|0||0||3||-2||0||0||style="background:#98FB98"|3*||-2||0||0||(-) means goals conceded
|-
|align="left"|25||align="left"|GK||align="left"|
|4||-1||1||0||0||0||5||-1||0||0||(-) means goals conceded
|-
|align="left"|61||align="left"|GK||align="left"|
|0||0||0||0||0||0||0||0||0||0||(-) means goals conceded
|-
|align="left"|||align="left"|DF||align="left"|
|3||0||3||0||0||0||0||0||0||0||
|-
|align="left"|||align="left"|DF||align="left"|
|0(1)||0||1||0||0||0||||0||1||0||
|-
|align="left"|||align="left"|DF||align="left"|
|3||0||1||0||0||0||4||0||0||0||
|-
|align="left"|||align="left"|DF||align="left"|
|6||0||1||0||0||0||7||0||3||0||
|-
|align="left"|14||align="left"|DF||align="left"|
|6||0||0||0||0||0||style="background:#98FB98"|6*||0||3||0||
|-
|align="left"|15||align="left"|DF||align="left"|
|6||0||0||0||0||0||6||0||0||0||
|-
|align="left"|16||align="left"|DF||align="left"|
|0||0||0||0||0||0||0||0||0||0||
|-
|align="left"|22||align="left"|DF||align="left"|
|0||0||4||0||0||0||4||0||3||0||
|-
|align="left"|28||align="left"|DF||align="left"|
|0||0||4||0||0||0||4||0||0||0||
|-
|align="left"|77||align="left"|DF||align="left"|Francisco Flores
|0||0||0||0||0||0||0||0||0||0||
|-
|align="left"|79||align="left"|DF||align="left"|
|0||0||3(1)||0||0||0||||0||1||0||
|-
|align="left"|84||align="left"|DF||align="left"|
|0||0||2(1)||0||0||0||||0||1||0||
|-
|align="left"|86||align="left"|DF||align="left"|
|0||0||0||0||0||0||0||0||0||0||
|-
|align="left"|||align="left"|MF||align="left"|
|6||0||0(1)||0||0||0||||0||0||0||
|-
|align="left"|||align="left"|MF||align="left"|
|2||0||0||0||0||0||2||0||0||0||
|-
|align="left"|||align="left"|MF||align="left"|
|6||0||0||0||0||0||6||0||0||0||
|-
|align="left"|10||align="left"|MF||align="left"|
|0(1)||0||1||1||0||0||||1||0||0||
|-
|align="left"|17||align="left"|MF||align="left"|
|5(1)||1||0||0||0||0||||1||2||0||
|-
|align="left"|18||align="left"|MF||align="left"|
|0(5)||0||4||0||0||0||||0||2||0||
|-
|align="left"|21||align="left"|MF||align="left"|
|0(2)||0||4||0||0||0||||0||2||0||
|-
|align="left"|24||align="left"|MF||align="left"|
|0||0||0||0||0||0||0||0||0||0||
|-
|align="left"|72||align="left"|MF||align="left"|
|0||0||0||0||0||0||0||0||0||0||
|-
|align="left"|73||align="left"|MF||align="left"|
|0||0||0(1)||0||0||0||||0||0||0||
|-
|align="left"|74||align="left"|MF||align="left"|
|0||0||0||0||0||0||0||0||0||0||
|-
|align="left"|78||align="left"|MF||align="left"|
|0||0||4||0||0||0||style="background:#98FB98"|4*||0||0||0||
|-
|align="left"|91||align="left"|MF||align="left"|
|0||0||0||0||0||0||0||0||0||0||
|-
|align="left"|||align="left"|FW||align="left"|
|5(1)||0||1||0||0||0||||0||0||0||
|-
|align="left"|11||align="left"|FW||align="left"|
|6||0||0||0||0||0||style="background:#98FB98"|6*||0||2||0||
|-
|align="left"|19||align="left"|FW||align="left"|
|0||0||0(3)||0||0||0||||0||1||0||
|-
|align="left"|20||align="left"|FW||align="left"|
|6||3||0||0||0||0||0||3||1||0||
|-
|align="left"|27||align="left"|FW||align="left"|
|0(6)||1||4||3||0||0||||4||1||0||
|-
|align="left"|75||align="left"|FW||align="left"|
|0||0||1(2)||0||0||0||||0||1||0||
|-
|align="left"|76||align="left"|FW||align="left"|
|0||0||0(1)||0||0||0||style="background:#98FB98"|||0||0||0||
|-
|align="left"|96||align="left"|FW||align="left"|
|0||0||2(2)||1||0||0||style="background:#98FB98"|||1||0||0||
|}

Overall statistics team
{|class="wikitable" style="text-align: center;"
|-
!style="background: #6050DC;color:#FFFFFF"|
!style="background: #6050DC;color:#FFFFFF"|Total
!style="background: #6050DC;color:#FFFFFF"| Home
!style="background: #6050DC;color:#FFFFFF"| Away
|-
|align=left| Games played || 0 || 0 || 0
|-
|align=left| Games won    || 0 || 0 || 0
|-
|align=left| Games drawn  || 0 || 0 || 0
|-
|align=left| Games lost   || 0 || 0 || 0
|-
|align=left| Biggest win (Apertura)  ||  ||  || 
|-
|align=left| Biggest win (Cup Apertura)  ||  ||  || 
|-
|align=left| Biggest win (Clausura)  ||  ||  || 
|-
|align=left| Biggest win (Cup Clausura)  ||  ||  || 
|-
|align=left| Biggest lose (Apertura)    ||   ||   || 
|-
|align=left| Biggest lose (Cup Apertura)    ||  ||  || 
|-
|align=left| Biggest lose (Clausura)    ||  ||  || 
|-
|align=left| Biggest lose (Cup Clausura)    ||  ||  || 
|-
|align=left| Goals scored    || 0 || 0 || 0
|-
|align=left| Goals conceded  || 0 || 0 || 0
|-
|align=left| Goal difference || 0 || 0 || 0
|-
|-
|-
|align=left| Most Game Started || 0 || colspan=2| 
|-
|align=left| Most appearances || 0 || colspan=2| 
|-
|align=left| Top scorer      || 0 || colspan=2| 
|-
|align=left| Points          || 0/0 (%) || 0/0 (%) || 0/0 (%)
|-
|align=left| Winning rate    || 0/0 (%) || 0/0 (%) || 0/0 (%)
|-

Goalscorers

Goal minutes
Updated to games played on 2 June.

Results

Apertura 2012

Results summary

Results by round

Copa Apertura 2012

Results summary

Results by round

Clausura 2013

Results summary

Results by round

IFFHS ranking
Cruz Azul position on the Club World Ranking during the 2012–13 season, according to IFFHS.

References

External links

Cruz Azul
Cruz Azul